Katrina Hibbert (born 29 September 1977) is an Australian basketball coach and retired professional basketball player.

Playing career

College
In her final year of High School, Hibbert travelled on exchange to the United States where she would attend Denham Springs High School, Louisiana, hoping to secure a college basketball scholarship. Hibbert played college basketball at Louisiana State University in Baton Rouge, Louisiana, playing with the Lady Tigers in the Southeastern Conference of NCAA Division I.

WNBA
After Hibbert spent four years playing college basketball she would then go on to be drafted in round 4 (pick 57 overall) of the 2000 WNBA draft by the Seattle Storm. In her first and only season, Hibbert played 20 games and has the honour of scoring the franchise's first ever points. Hibbert was released before the start of the 2001 WNBA season and returned to Australia.

WNBL
In the domestic Women's National Basketball League (WNBL) Hibbert played 112 games for the Bulleen Boomers. During her WNBL career, Hibbert was named the Most Valuable Player on two occasions; 2004/05 and 2005/06. Hibbert was also named to the WNBL All-Star Five on two occasions; 2004/05 and 2005/06. Hibbert was a member of the national team roster during the 2000s and played in the Australian team that won a gold medal at the 2006 Commonwealth Games. Hibbert announced her retirement from WNBL basketball in March 2009.

Coaching career

WNBL
After brief head coaching stints in the Big V with the Hume City Broncos and Eltham Wildcats, Hibbert took on a Lead Assistant Coach position with the Melbourne Boomers, under head coach Guy Molloy. Following on from this, Hibbert was then appointed as Head Coach of the Sydney Uni Flames ahead of the 2019–20 season.

Coaching record

WNBL 

|-
| align="left" |Sydney
| align="left" |2019–20
| 21
| 7
| 14
|
| align="center" |6th of 8
|–
|–
|–
|–
|
|-class="sortbottom"
| align="left" |Career
| ||21||7||14|||| ||0||0||0||

See also
 List of Australian WNBA players

References

1977 births
Living people
Australian expatriate basketball people in the United States
Australian women's basketball players
Australian women's basketball coaches
Basketball players at the 2006 Commonwealth Games
Commonwealth Games gold medallists for Australia
Commonwealth Games medallists in basketball
Melbourne Boomers players
Seattle Storm draft picks
Seattle Storm players
20th-century Australian women
21st-century Australian women
Medallists at the 2006 Commonwealth Games